William McHugh (1885 - 4 December 1947) was an Irish hurler. He was a member of the Wexford team that won the All-Ireland Championship in 1910.

Honours

Wexford
All-Ireland Senior Hurling Championship (1): 1910
Leinster Senior Hurling Championship (1): 1910

References

1885 births
1947 deaths
Wexford inter-county hurlers
All-Ireland Senior Hurling Championship winners